The 1934 Santa Clara Broncos football team was an American football team that represented Santa Clara University as an independent during the 1934 college football season. In their sixth season under head coach Maurice J. "Clipper" Smith, the Broncos compiled a 7–2–1 record and outscored opponents by a total of 133 to 35. They defeated Pacific Coast Conference opponent California (20–0), tied Stanford (7–7), and sustained their only losses to rival Saint Mary's (0–7) and TCU (7–9).

Schedule

References

Santa Clara
Santa Clara Broncos football seasons
Santa Clara Broncos football